An unused highway is a highway or highway ramp that was partially or fully constructed, but went unused or was later closed. An unused roadway or ramp may often be referred to as an abandoned road, ghost road, highway to nowhere, stub ramp, ghost ramp, ski jump, stub street, stub-out, or simply stub.

Examples

Some examples of reasons for unused highways include:

 An older portion of roadway being left unused by a highway realignment. The Abandoned Pennsylvania Turnpike is one instance of this, where two 2-lane tunnels and 4-lane approaches were bypassed with 4-lane cuts. The old tunnels and approach roadways in this case are being rehabilitated for a multi-use trail. Some parts of the A1 and A3 motorways in Italy have been recently abandoned after some dangerous, curvy and narrow mountain stretches were replaced by wider and straighter alignments through new viaducts and tunnels. In many roads in the Alps, some dangerous sections were replaced by tunnels and the abandoned parts are usually closed to traffic and used as hiking trails.
 A road which existed to serve a bridge becomes a dead-end once the bridge is demolished or left to deteriorate to the point where it can no longer be safely used. This is common on some older alignments of U.S. Route 66 which were bypassed, as the route was changed through multiple realignments before becoming a decommissioned highway in 1985.
 A road becomes a dead end once a level railway crossing is closed and replaced by an overpass/underpass some distance away from the former level crossing (common in Greece).
 A highway being closed and demolished, where stubs remain on intersecting roads. Examples include ramps from the Embarcadero Freeway that remained on the Bay Bridge approach (Interstate 80) in San Francisco after the demolition of the Embarcadero Freeway proper. The remaining ramps were demolished in 2010–11 during demolition of the old Transbay Terminal to make way for the new Transbay Transit Center.
 Highway construction begins but is cancelled, possibly because of a freeway revolt. Examples include: 
 The Pennsylvania Route 23 "Goat Path" east of Lancaster, which was graded for a four-lane expressway. The project was cancelled before paving could commence, so the roadbeds were planted over with grass. 
 In London, the M11 motorway has two short unused slips at Junction 4 (Charlie Brown's) which would have been a link for the M12 motorway to head east into Essex. 
 The R.H. Thomson Expressway in Seattle was never built, leaving stub ramps. 
 Likewise, there are unused ramps for the never-built Inner Belt and Southwest Corridor (respectively, I-695 and part of an unused alignment for I-95) in Boston, Massachusetts. 
 There was a similar situation on the A4 motorway near Delft, Netherlands, where works started in the 1960s but were stopped (and finished in 2016). 
 In Italy, the A31 motorway ends in the middle of nowhere, because works for extending it towards the A22 were stopped after protests in the late 1970s. 
 The  Guinza tunnel, part of the planned European route E78 Grosseto–Fano expressway, was completed in 1991, and never opened to traffic. https://goo.gl/maps/ACeNPKTLjYrBrLfd9
 Another example is in Connecticut, along I-84, near Hartford. It is the only four-level stack interchange in the state, however it is only partly used.
 New York's parkway system has many stubs because it was the primary freeway system in the state (and still makes up a major portion of it, particularly in and near NYC) before the Interstate Highway System came to fruition. Once New York started building Interstate Highways, however, many of the expansion projects in progress for the state's parkways were abandoned. Examples include exit 2 and exit 9 on the Cross County Parkway, the Taconic State Parkway at I-90, the Northern State Parkway at NY 454, and both the eastern and western terminus of the Lake Ontario State Parkway.
 Cape Town's Foreshore Freeway Bridge, which has stood unfinished since construction was halted in 1977.
 Stubs are built to connect to a highway that is not yet constructed. These stubs are very common in the state of North Carolina, where they will eventually connect to new stretches of I-73, I-74, and I-840, among others, along the Greensboro Urban Loop. Remnants of stub ramps can be seen on the Massachusetts Turnpike in West Stockbridge. The ramps were used to connect the newly built highway, completed in May 1957, with local roads prior to the connection with the New York State Thruway, completed to the NY-MA state line in May 1959. Also, in Melbourne, Florida, the westernmost point of Pineda Causeway will eventually connect to Wickham Road, but for the meantime, it has been blocked westward of the I-95 ramp.
 When a divided highway ends, there are sometimes a stub exists where more of the highway could become a divided highway and tie into the stub.
 A part of the highway can become unused due to changes in national borders. Some stretches of the Berlin–Königsberg autobahn are unused after the partition of East Prussia because the highway lacks a border crossing between Poland and Russia. Some small roads between different European countries did not have border crossing facilities and were closed to traffic until those countries joined the Schengen Agreement. Some border roads are closed when the two countries have bad relations or are at war with each other, for example between Algeria-Morocco, North Korea-South Korea, Israel-Lebanon, Israel-Syria, Turkey-Armenia, and Azerbaijan-Armenia. Even countries on good terms with each other have decided to close some less-trafficked cross-border roads for security reasons, as the US and Canada did along their border south of Montreal prior to the 1976 Summer Olympics there.
 The highway is used for a purpose different from what was originally intended. The east end of I-70 in Baltimore and the stub of I-95 inside the Capital Beltway northeast of Washington, DC, are two examples because of the cancellations of their alignments within the inner city. Both of these stubs are used for park-and-ride facilities. In England, improvement works in 1987 rerouted the A47 in Rutland near Wardley, resulting in an unused stretch of carriageway that was left behind, which functions only as access to a transmitting station. Part of the A2 in Kent was realigned in 2009, leaving a substantial part of the original road intact. Part of the road has been made into a public park. On I-90 near Albany, New York, an interchange was built for the planned I-687; that interchange (labeled as exit 5A off I-90) now serves as an exit for Corporate Woods Boulevard. The exit ramps occupy nearly as much space as the area they serve.
 The highway has unused lanes. The 1000 Islands Parkway contains two "ghost lanes" for its entire  length. Its right-of-way is four-lane divided, as it was part of Highway 401, Canada's busiest highway, during that freeway's construction. When Highway 401 was ultimately completed in 1968, the final 1000 Islands bypass took a path further inland. Two lanes of the original four-lane waterfront right-of-way were retained and used for the scenic parkway, the rest becoming small pedestrian or bicycle trails laid out in an otherwise-vacant freeway-grade right-of-way.

See also
Bridge to nowhere

References

External links

Cancelled highway projects
Road junction types
Highways
Waste of resources